Elections for the Pennsylvania State Senate were held on November 5, 2002, with even-numbered districts being contested. State Senators are elected for four-year terms, with half of the Senate seats up for a vote every two years. The term of office for those elected in 2002 ran from January 3, 2003 until November 28, 2006. Necessary primary elections were held on May 21, 2002.

This was the first Pennsylvania State Senate election held after the constitutionally-mandated decennial reapportionment plan.

None of the seats of the three senators who did not run for re-election changed party hands. Robert C. Wonderling succeeded the retiring Republican senator, Edwin G. Holl. John C. Rafferty, Jr. succeeded Republican Senator James W. Gerlach, who successfully ran for Pennsylvania's 6th congressional district. Jim Ferlo, a veteran member of Pittsburgh's City Council, succeeded the retiring Democratic senator Leonard J. Bodack.

General Elections

References
 
 
 

2002 Pennsylvania elections
2002
Pennsylvania Senate